Phyllonorycter lalagella is a moth of the family Gracillariidae. It is known from Australia.

References

lalagella
Moths of Australia
Moths described in 1856